Victor John William "Vic" Skermer  (1908November 1992) was an Australian public servant. He was Commonwealth Auditor-General between June 1961 and May 1973.

Life and career
In 1925, Skermer joined the Commonwealth Public Service as a mechanic-in-training at the Postmaster-General's Department.

Prime Minister Robert Menzies announced Skermer's appointment as Auditor-General on 2 June 1961. The appointment was a promotion for Skermer from his position as Deputy Auditor-General. Between 1961 and 1971, the accounts and records of three new departments and 44 new statutory bodies came within the remit of Skermer's audits—a huge growth in the Auditor-General's auditing function.

Skermer retired in 1973, after 48 years of public service.

In November 1992, after several months of illness, Skermer died aged 84.

References

1908 births
1992 deaths
Australian public servants
Australian Commanders of the Order of the British Empire
Australian Freemasons
Auditors